Calò is an Italian surname. Notable people with the surname include:

 Carla Calò (1926–2019), Italian actress
 Eugenio Calò (1906–1944), Italian national hero
 Francesco Calò, Italian painter
 Giacomo Calò (born 1997), Italian footballer
 Giuseppe Calò (born 1931), Sicilian Mafioso
 Romano Calò (1883–1952), Italian actor

See also

Caloy
Carlo (name)

Italian-language surnames